The Nossa Senhora do Castelo Chapel (Portuguese: Capela de Nossa Senhora do Castelo) is a chapel in Mangualde, Portugal. It is currently in the process of being a designated heritage site.

References

Buildings and structures completed in the 14th century
Nossa Senhora Castelo Mangualde
Churches in Viseu District
Buildings and structures in Mangualde
14th-century Roman Catholic church buildings in Portugal